The Hôtel-Lamoignon – Mark-Ashton Garden, is a green space located in the 4th arrondissement of Paris next to the .

Location 

This site is serviced by the Saint-Paul metro station.

Origins of the name 
The garden takes its name after young British LGBT-activist and Young Communist League general secretary Mark Ashton (1960–1987), by vote of the Council of Paris.

Description 
The garden was formerly the property of the  mansion.

History 

Annexes

See also 
 List of parks and gardens in Paris
 4th arrondissement of Paris
 Le Marais
 Mark Ashton
 Bibliothèque historique de la ville de Paris
 Hôtel d'Angoulême Lamoignon

References 

HIV/AIDS memorials
Parks in France
Gardens in Paris
Le Marais